What's Next is an album by Frank Marino & Mahogany Rush, released in 1980, under Columbia Records. A bootleg CD edition of this album exists, taken from a vinyl source with additional live tracks recorded in Salinas, California, during the Juggernaut tour of 1983.

Track listing
All songs by Frank Marino, except "Roadhouse Blues" written by Jim Morrison, Robby Krieger, Ray Manzarek, John Densmore; "Mona" written by Bo Diddley; "Rock Me Baby" written by B.B. King.

"You Got Livin" - 4:37
"Finish Line" - 4:08
"Rock Me Baby" - 4:48
"Something's Comin' Our Way" - 6:42
"Roadhouse Blues" - 5:25
"Loved by You" - 8:38
"Rock 'n' Roll Hall of Fame" - 4:03
"Mona" - 4:23

Bootleg CD edition live bonus tracks
"Midnight Highway" - 4:00
"Maybe It's Time" - 6:01
"Juggernaut" - 4:07
"Something's Coming Our Way" - 4:55
"Strange Dreams" - 6:32

Personnel
Frank Marino - Lead guitar, lead vocals
Paul Harwood - Bass
Jimmy Ayoub - Drums
Vince Marino - Rhythm guitar

Charts

References

1980 albums
Mahogany Rush albums
Columbia Records albums